The Echo class were nuclear cruise missile submarines of the Soviet Navy built during the 1960s. Their Soviet designation was Project 659 for the first five vessels, and Project 675 for the following twenty-nine. Their NATO reporting names were Echo I and Echo II. All were decommissioned by 1994.

Echo I class 
The Soviet Echo I class (Project 659 class) were completed at Komsomolsk in the Soviet far east in 1960 to 1963. The Echo I class were classed as SSGNs armed with six launchers for the P-5 Pyatyorka (SS-N-3C, "Shaddock") land-attack cruise missile. The Echo I class had to operate in a strategic rather than anti-shipping role because of the lack of fire control and guidance radars.

As the Soviet SSBN force built up, the need for these boats diminished so they were converted to the Project 659T SSNs between 1969 and 1974. The conversion involved the removal of the cruise missiles, the plating over and the streamlining of the hull to reduce underwater noise of the launchers and the modification of the sonar systems to the standard of the  SSNs.

All the Echo Is were deployed in the Pacific Fleet. The last two boats were scrapped in the early 1990s.

Ships

Echo II class 
The Echo II class (Project 675 class) were built at Severodvinsk (18 vessels) and Komsomolsk (11 vessels) between 1962 and 1967 as anti-carrier missile submarines. The Echo II class carried eight P-6 (SS-N-3a "Shaddock") anti-ship cruise missiles mounted in pairs above the pressure hull.

To fire the missiles, the ship had to surface and the missile was elevated to 15 degrees. The Echo II class also had fire control and guidance radar. The Echo II class could fire all eight missiles in 30 minutes, but would have to wait on the surface until the missile mid-course correction and final target selection had been sent unless guidance had been handed over to a third party.

The conversions (Project 675M) could be distinguished by the fitting bulges either side of the sail.

Three of these modified units were further upgraded under Project 675MKV towards the end of the Cold War. It replaced steel components with titanium to reduce weight, and had an improved propulsion system. It appeared to have used a similar fire-control system to the P-500, the Argon-KV and Argument radar. The P-1000 was installed on three units of the Northern Fleet between 1987 and 1993. The conversion of two boats of the Pacific Fleet, K-10 and K-34, was abandoned due to lack of funds.

The Echo II class were divided evenly between the Pacific and Northern Fleets. The boats were obsolete by the mid-1980s, and were deleted in 1989 and 1995.

Ships

Accidents
Submarines of the Echo class were involved in several accidents :

20 June 1970
 K-108 (Echo II) collided with submarine  in the Sea of Okhotsk at a depth . The outer hull of K-108 was damaged in the area of compartments VIII and IX, and the sail of Tautog was damaged and the access trunk in it was flooded. There were no fatalities.
14 June 1973
 K-56 (Echo II) collided with the Soviet large refrigerating trawler Akademik Berg. The submarine was holed in the bow, and 27 were killed when compartments I and II flooded.
20 August 1973
The bow was significantly damaged.
28 August 1976
 K-22 (Echo II) collided with frigate  in the Mediterranean Sea, and both ships were seriously damaged. K-22 had damage to missile container No. 1, extension devices and the fin structure, and went to Kithira in the Aegean Sea for repairs. The American frigate was damaged at the stern, and had to be towed to Crete.
24 September 1976
 K-47 (Echo II) while in the North Atlantic a fire broke out in compartment VIII (living quarters) due to short circuit. Three were killed by carbon monoxide poisoning.
2 July 1979
 K-116 (Echo II) suffered a reactor accident (a leak of core coolant from the port reactor) in the Bay of Vladimir, Sea of Japan. Some of the crew received a large dose of radiation, but there were no fatalities.
21 August 1980
 K-122 (Echo I) had a fire in compartment VII (turbo-electric) when  to the east of Okinawa. Fourteen dead due to carbon monoxide poisoning.
10 September 1981
 K-45 (Echo I) collided with Soviet fishing trawler Novokachalinsk at  night. The bow of the outer hull and the sonar system of the submarine was seriously damaged. The trawler sank.
18 June 1984
 K-131 (Echo II) a fire broke out in compartment VIII due to violation of safety methods by an electrician, while in the Barents Sea. Fourteen dead
10 August 1985
 K-431 (ex-K-31) (Echo II) had a reactor explosion while refueling in the shipyard at Chazhma Bay, Sea of Japan. Ten dead (300 men from rescue parties received various doses of radiation, several died later).
November 1986
 K-175 (Echo II), while at its homebase (Pacific Fleet), suffered an explosion in the reactor compartment, causing radioactivity discharge and contamination of nearby territory. No fatalities.
1989
 K-1 (Echo II mod) reactor accident. 
26 June 1989
 K-192 (ex-K-172) (Echo II) had a reactor accident (a break in the first loop of the starboard reactor) while off Bear Island, Barents Sea. The crew received a dose of radiation, but there were no fatalities.

See also
1966 Soviet submarine global circumnavigation

References

Further reading

External links
Ship Encyclopedia - Project 659 
Ship Encyclopedia - Project 675 
Federation of American Scientists

Submarine classes
 
Russian and Soviet navy submarine classes
Cruise missile submarines